Lone Smidt Nielsen (née Hansen; born 1 January 1961) is a Danish former international footballer who played professionally in Italy with ACF Trani.

Lone's daughter Karoline Smidt Nielsen also played football, for Turbine Potsdam and Denmark's national team.

References

External links
 Lone Smidt Nielsen profile at Danish Football Association website

Danish women's footballers
Denmark women's international footballers
1961 births
Living people
Serie A (women's football) players
A.C.F. Trani 80 players
People from Vejle Municipality
Women's association football forwards
Danish expatriate men's footballers
Expatriate women's footballers in Italy
Danish expatriate sportspeople in Italy
Sportspeople from the Region of Southern Denmark